David B. Kaplan (born 1958) is an American physicist.  He is a Professor of Physics at the University of Washington where he was Director of the Institute for Nuclear Theory during the period 2006-2016 and is now a Senior Fellow.

Research
Kaplan's research deals with various aspects of quantum field theory, applied to models of physics beyond the Standard Model, cosmology, nuclear physics, and lattice QCD.  He is known for his work on the theory of the composite Higgs boson, the role of the strange quark in dense matter and the phenomenon of kaon condensation, development of the theory of electroweak baryogenesis and other aspects of particle astrophysics, for lattice models with exact supersymmetry, and for the formulation of lattice gauge theory with chiral fermions. The latter is known as the theory of domain-wall fermions, and is an early example of what has later become known among condensed matter physicists as a topological insulator and the quantum spin Hall effect.

Recognition
Kaplan is a Member of the National Academy of Sciences, the American Academy of Arts and Sciences, and the Washington State Academy of Sciences, and is a Fellow of the American Physical Society. He is a recipient of the Department of Energy Outstanding Junior Investigator Award, the National Science Foundation Presidential Young Investigator Award, and an Alfred P. Sloan Foundation fellowship. He was awarded the 2022 Herman Feshbach Prize in Theoretical Nuclear Physics.

Personal history
Kaplan graduated from the Lakeside School in Seattle, WA in 1976. He obtained his B.S. at Stanford University in 1980 under the supervision of Melvin Schwartz and Ph.D. in 1985 at Harvard University under the supervision of Howard Georgi. He was a Junior Fellow at the Harvard Society of Fellows from 1985 to 1988 and a member of the physics department at the University of California, San Diego from 1988 to 1993, before moving to the University of Washington in 1994. He was married to Ann Nelson, also a theoretical physicist, until her death in a hiking accident in August 2019.

References

External links 
 Institute for Nuclear Theory home page
 David Kaplan's home page

20th-century American physicists
21st-century American physicists
American nuclear physicists
1958 births
Stanford University alumni
Harvard University alumni
Harvard Fellows
University of California, San Diego faculty
University of Washington faculty
Living people
Particle physicists
Lakeside School alumni
Fellows of the American Academy of Arts and Sciences
Members of the United States National Academy of Sciences
Fellows of the American Physical Society